The Colorado Mesa Mavericks (formerly Mesa State Mavericks) are the athletic teams that represent Colorado Mesa University, located in Grand Junction, Colorado, in NCAA Division II intercollegiate sports. The Mavericks compete as members of the Rocky Mountain Athletic Conference for all 21 varsity sports.

Facilities
 Bergman Practice Fields
 Baseball
 Football
 CMU Softball Field – softball
 Elliott Tennis Complex – tennis
 Two intramural athletic fields
 Brownson Arena – basketball, volleyball, wrestling
 El Pomar Natatorium – swimming and diving
 Maverick Pavilion – indoor athletic courts (Fall 2011)
 Ralph Stocker Stadium – football, track and field
 Suplizio Field – baseball
 Walker Field – soccer, lacrosse

Varsity sports

Teams

Men's sports
 Baseball
 Basketball
 Cross Country
 Football
 Golf
 Lacrosse
 Soccer
 Swimming & Diving
 Tennis
 Track & Field
 Wrestling

Women's sports
 Basketball
 Beach volleyball *
 Cross Country
 Golf
 Lacrosse
 Soccer
 Softball
 Swimming & Diving
 Tennis
 Track & Field
 Volleyball
 Wrestling

Emerging sports
 Men's Hockey
 Cheerleading
 Cycling
 Rodeo
 Rugby
 Skiing – Alpine
 Skiing – Nordic

 * = Beach volleyball is a fully sanctioned NCAA sport which had its first national championship in the spring of 2016. The Colorado Mesa team competes as an independent.

Non-varsity sports
In addition to varsity sports, CMU has a large number of emerging sports, men's hockey, cheer-leading, cycling, rodeo, Alpine skiing, Nordic skiing, and rugby, Club sports include, men's and women's soccer, men's rugby, men's volleyball, and water polo as well as active outdoors and intramural programs. The intramural sports include flag football, ultimate frisbee, indoor soccer, dodgeball, tennis, volleyball, and basketball, among many others.

Program notes
Since 1958, Grand Junction has co-hosted the NJCAA Junior College World Series at Suplizio Field, unassociated to the CMU Athletic Department

CMU plays host to several summer sports camps and clinics including baseball, football, cross country, cheerleading, lacrosse, swimming, soccer, track and field, volleyball, and wrestling, as well as the largest summer basketball camp west of the Mississippi River.

References

External links